Køge Museum is a local history museum in Køge, Denmark.

Building
The museum is based in a two-storey, half-timbered  building from the 16th century. A long side wing to the rear of the main wing forms the last remains of a larger complex which surrounded two interior courtyards.

Garden
To the rear of the main wing is a garden with a small playground. It is accessible through the gate with ticket to the museum.

References

External links
 Official website

Listed buildings and structures in Køge Municipality
Local museums in Metropolitan Copenhagen
Museums in Region Zealand
Timber framed buildings in Køge Municipality